Billings is the largest city in the U.S. state of Montana, with a population of 117,116 as of the 2020 census. Located in the south-central portion of the state, it is the seat of Yellowstone County and the principal city of the Billings Metropolitan Area, which had a population of 184,167 in the 2020 census. It has a trade area of over 500,000.

Billings was nicknamed the "Magic City" because of its rapid growth from its founding as a railroad town in March 1882. The nearby Crow and Cheyenne peoples called the city Ammalapáshkuua and É'êxováhtóva respectively. With one of the largest trade areas in the United States, Billings is the trade and distribution center for much of Montana east of the Continental Divide, Northern Wyoming, and western portions of North Dakota and South Dakota. Billings is also the largest retail destination for much of the same area.

The city is experiencing rapid growth and a strong economy; it has had and is continuing to have the largest growth of any city in Montana. Parts of the metro area are seeing hyper growth. From 2000 to 2010 Lockwood, an eastern suburb, saw growth of 57.8%, the largest growth rate of any community in Montana. Billings has avoided the economic downturn that affected most of the nation from 2008 to 2012 as well as the housing bust. With more hotel accommodations than any area within a five-state region, the city hosts a variety of conventions, concerts, sporting events, and other rallies. With the Bakken oil development in eastern Montana and western North Dakota, the largest oil discovery in U.S. history, as well as the Heath shale oil discovery just north of Billings, the city's growth rate stayed high during the shale oil boom. Although the city is growing, its growth rate has diminished markedly with oil price declines in recent years.

Attractions in and around Billings include ZooMontana, Yellowstone Art Museum, Pompey's Pillar, Pictograph Cave, Chief Plenty Coups State Park. Little Bighorn Battlefield National Monument, Bighorn Canyon National Recreation Area, Red Lodge Mountain Resort, the Beartooth Highway, which connects Red Lodge and Yellowstone National Park.

History

Name
The city is named for Frederick H. Billings, a former president of the Northern Pacific Railroad from Woodstock, Vermont. An earlier name for the area was Clark's Fork Bottom.

The Crow  people from the nearby Crow Indian Reservation call the city . It means 'where they cut wood', and is named as such because of a sawmill built in the area by early white settlers.

Prehistory
The downtown core and much of the rest of Billings is in the Yellowstone Valley, a canyon carved out by the Yellowstone River. Around 80 million years ago, the Billings area was on the shore of the Western Interior Seaway. The sea deposited sediment and sand around the shoreline. As the sea retreated, it left a deep layer of sand. Over millions of years, this sand was compressed into stone known as Eagle Sandstone. Over the last million years the river has carved its way down through this stone to form the canyon walls known as the Billings Rimrocks or the Rims.

The Pictograph Caves are about five miles south of downtown. These caves contain over 100 pictographs (rock paintings), the oldest of which is over 2,000 years old. Approximately 30,000 artifacts (including stone tools and weapons) have been excavated from the site. These excavations have proved the area has been occupied since at least 2600 BC until after 1800 AD.

The Crow Indians have called the Billings area home since about 1700. The present-day Crow Nation is just south of Billings.

Lewis and Clark Expedition
In July 1806, William Clark (of the Lewis and Clark Expedition) passed through the Billings area. On July 25 he arrived at what is now known as Pompey's Pillar and wrote in his journal "... at 4 P M arrived at a remarkable rock, i ascended this rock and from its top had a most extensive view in every direction." Clark carved his name and the date into the rock, leaving the only remaining physical evidence of their expedition. He named the place Pompey's Tower, naming it after the son of his Shoshone interpreter and guide Sacajawea. In 1965, Pompey's Pillar was designated as a national historic landmark, and was proclaimed a national monument in January 2001. An interpretive center has been built next to the monument.

Coulson/Billings

The area where Billings is today was known as Clark's Fork Bottom. Clark's Fork Bottom was to be the hub for hauling freight to Judith and Musselshell Basins. At the time these were some of the most productive areas of the Montana Territory. The plan was to run freight up Alkali Creek, now part of Billings Heights, to the basins and Fort Benton on the Hi-Line.

In 1877 settlers from the Gallatin Valley area of the Montana Territory formed Coulson the first town of the Yellowstone Valley. The town was started when John Alderson built a sawmill and convinced PW McAdow to open a general store and trading post on land Alderson owned on the bank of the Yellowstone River. The store went by the name of Headquarters, and soon other buildings and tents were being built as the town began to grow. At this time before the coming of the railroad, most goods coming to and going from the Montana Territory were carried on paddle riverboats. It is believed it was decided to name the new town Coulson in an attempt to attract the Coulson Packet Company that ran riverboats between St Louis and many points in the Montana Territory. In spite of their efforts the river was traversed only once by paddle riverboat to the point of the new town.

Coulson was a rough town of dance halls and saloons and not a single church. The town needed a sheriff and the famous mountain man John "Liver-Eating" Johnson took the job. Many disagreements were settled with a gun in the coarse Wild West town. Soon a graveyard was needed and Boothill Cemetery was created. It was called Boothill because most of the people in it were said to have died with their boots on. Today, Boothill Cemetery sits within Billings' city limits and is the only remaining physical evidence of Coulson's existence.

When the railroad came to the area, Coulson residents were sure the town would become the railroads hub and Coulson would soon be the Territories largest city. The railroad only had claim to odd sections and it had two sections side-by-side about two miles west of Coulson. Being able to make far more money by creating a new town on these two sections the railroad decided to create the new town of Billings, the two towns existed side by side for a short time with a trolley even running between them. However, most of Coulson's residents moved to the new booming town of Billings. In the end Coulson faded away with the last remains of the town disappearing in the 1930s. Today Coulson Park, a Billings city park, sits on the river bank where Coulson once was.

Early railroad town
Named after Northern Pacific Railway president Frederick H. Billings, the city was founded in 1882. The Railroad formed the city as a western railhead for its further westward expansion. At first the new town had only three buildings but within just a few months it had grown to over 2,000. This spurred Billings' nickname of the Magic City because, like magic, it seemed to appear overnight.

The nearby town of Coulson appeared a far more likely site. Coulson was a rough-and-tumble town where arguments were often followed by gunplay. Liver-Eating Johnson was a lawman in Coulson. Perhaps the most famous person to be buried in Coulson's Boothill cemetery is H.M. "Muggins" Taylor, the scout who carried the news of Custer's Last Stand at the Battle of Little Bighorn to the world. Most buried here were said to have died with their boots on. The town of Coulson had been on the Yellowstone River, which made it ideal for the commerce steamboats brought up the river. However, when the Montana & Minnesota Land Company oversaw the development of potential railroad land, they ignored Coulson, and platted the new town of Billings just a couple of miles to the northwest. Coulson quickly faded away; most of her residents were absorbed into Billings. Yet, for a short time, the two towns coexisted; a trolley even ran between them. But ultimately there was no future for Coulson as Billings grew. Though it stood on the banks of the Yellowstone River only a couple of miles from the heart of present-day downtown Billings, the city of Billings never built on the land where Coulson once stood. Today Coulson Park sits along the banks of the Yellowstone where the valley's first town once stood.

20th century
By the 1910 census, Billings' population had risen to 10,031 ranking it the sixth fastest-growing community in the nation. Billings became an energy center in the early years of the twentieth century with the discovery of oil fields in Montana and Wyoming. Then the discovery of large natural gas and coal reserves secured the city's rank as first in energy. In the early 20th century, its served as regional trading center and energy hub for eastern Montana and northern Wyoming, an area then known as the Midland Empire.

After World War II, Billings became the region's major financial, medical and cultural center. Billings has had rapid growth from its founding; in its first 50 years growth was, at times, as high as 200 to 300 percent per decade.

Billings growth has remained robust throughout the years, and in the 1950s, it had a growth rate of 66 percent. The 1973 oil embargo by OPEC spurred an oil boom in eastern Montana, northern Wyoming and western North Dakota. With this increase in oil production, Billings became the headquarters for energy sector companies. In 1975 and 1976, the Colstrip coal-fire generation plants 1 and 2 were completed; plants 3 and 4 started operating in 1984 and 1986.

In the 1970s and 1980s, Billings saw major growth in its downtown core; the first high-rise buildings to be built in Montana were erected. In 1980, the 22-floor Sheraton Hotel was completed. Upon its completion, it was declared "the tallest load-bearing brick masonry building in the world" by the Brick Institute of America. During the 1970s and 1980s, other major buildings were constructed in the downtown core; the Norwest Building (now Wells Fargo), Granite Tower, Sage Tower, the MetraPark arena, the TransWestern Center, many new city-owned parking garages, and the First Interstate Center, the tallest building in a five-state area.

With the completion of large sections of the interstate system in Montana in the 1970s, Billings became a shopping destination for an ever-larger area. The 1970s and 1980s saw new shopping districts and shopping centers developed in the Billings area. In addition to the other shopping centers, two new malls were developed, and Rimrock Mall was redeveloped and enlarged, on what was then the city's west end. Cross Roads Mall was built in Billings Heights, and West Park Plaza mall in midtown. Several new business parks were also developed on the city's west end during this period.

Billings was affected by the 1980 eruption of Mount St. Helens in May; the city received about an inch of ash on the ground. The Yellowstone fires of 1988 blanketed Billings in smoke for weeks.

In the 1990s, the service sector in the city increased with the development of new shopping centers built around big box stores such as Target, Walmart and Office Depot, all of which built multiple outlets in the Billings area. With the addition of more interchange exits along I-90, additional hotel chains and service industry outlets are being built in Billings. Development of business parks and large residential developments on the city's west end, South Hills area, Lockwood, and the Billings Heights were all part of the 1990s. Billings received the All-America City Award in 1992.

21st century

In the 21st century, Billings saw the development of operations centers in the city's business parks and downtown core by such national companies as GE, Wells Fargo and First Interstate Bank. It also saw renewed growth in the downtown core with the addition of many new buildings, new parking garages and a new MET Transit Center, and in 2002 Skypoint was completed. Downtown also saw a renaissance of the historic areas within the downtown core as building after building was restored. In 2007, Billings was designated a Preserve America Community.

With the completion of the Shiloh interchange exit off Interstate 90, the TransTech Center was developed and more hotel development occurred as well. In 2010 the Shiloh corridor was open for business with the completion of the Shiloh parkway, a  multi-lane street with eight roundabouts. More shopping centers were developed in the 21st century. One of the newest is Shiloh Crossing, which brought the first Kohl's department store to Montana. Other new centers include Billings Town Square with Montana's first Cabela's, and West Park Promenade, Montana's first open-air shopping mall. In 2009, Fortune Small Business magazine named Billings the best small city in which to start a business. Billings saw continued growth with the largest actual growth of any city in Montana. On June 20, 2010 (Father's Day), a tornado touched down in the downtown core and Heights sections of Billings. The MetraPark Arena and area businesses suffered major damage.

In the 2010s, Eastern Montana and North Dakota have experienced an energy boom due to the Bakken formation, the largest oil discovery in U.S. history. If built, it would be the tallest building in Montana and Montana's first building to meet or exceed the  mark.

Geography

Two-thirds of the city is in the Yellowstone Valley and the South Hills area and one-third in the Heights-Lockwood area. The city is divided by the Rims, long cliffs, also called the Rimrocks. The Yellowstone River runs through the southeast portion of the city.

Around Billings, seven mountain ranges can be viewed. They are also home the Pryor Mountain Wild Horse Range. It was called "the most beautiful drive in America" by Charles Kuralt. The Beartooth Mountains are just northeast of Yellowstone National Park. The Bull Mountains are a low-lying heavily forested range north of Billings Heights.

Climate
Downtown Billings has a hot-summer humid continental climate (Köppen: Dfa) depending on the isotherm used, closely bordering on semi-arid (Köppen: BSk), with dry, hot summers, and cold, dry winters. However, areas outside of downtown can have a hot-summer continental climate, even with the  isotherm, due to the urban heat island effect, as exemplified by the Billings Logan International Airport. The snowfall averages  a year, but because of warm chinook winds that pass through the region during the winter, snow does not usually accumulate heavily or remain on the ground for long: the greatest depth has been  on April 5, 1955, after a huge storm which dumped  of water equivalent precipitation as snow in the previous three days under temperatures averaging .

The first freeze of the season on average arrives by October 6 and the last is May 5. Spring and autumn in Billings are usually mild, but brief. Winds, while strong at times, are considered light compared with the rest of Montana and the Rocky Mountain Front.

Due to its location, Billings is susceptible to severe summer weather as well. On June 20, 2010, a tornado touched down in the Billings Heights and Downtown sections of the city. The tornado was accompanied by hail up to golf ball size, dangerous cloud-to-ground lightning, and heavy winds. The tornado destroyed a number of businesses and severely damaged the 12,000-seat MetraPark Arena.

Sections

Billings has many sections that comprise the whole of the city. The sections are often defined by Billings unique physical characteristics. For example, a  cliff known as the "Rims" separates the Heights from downtown Billings.

There are 11 boroughs called "sections" within Billings' city limits.

Neighborhoods and zones
The south side of Billings is probably the oldest residential area in the city, and it is the city's most culturally diverse neighborhood. South Park is an old growth City park, host to several food fairs and festivals in the summer months. The Bottom Westend Historic District is home to many of Billings' first mansions. Midtown, the most densely populated portion of the city is in the midst of gentrification on a level few, if any, areas in Montana have ever seen. New growth is mainly concentrated on Billings West End, where Shiloh Crossing is a new commercial development, anchored by Scheels, Montana's largest retail store. Residentially, the West End is characterized by upper income households. Denser, more urban growth is occurring in Josephine Crossing, one of Billings' many new contemporary neighborhoods. Downtown is a blend of small businesses and office space, together with restaurants and a walkable brewery district. The Heights, defined as the area of the city northeast of the Metra, is predominantly residential, and a new school was recently constructed to accommodate growth in the neighborhood.

Surrounding areas

Billings is the principal city of the Billings Metropolitan Statistical Area. The metropolitan area consists of three counties: Yellowstone, Stillwater, and Carbon. The population of the entire metropolitan area was at 184,167 in the 2020 Census.

Demographics

2010 census
As of the census of 2010, there were 104,170 people, 43,945 households, and 26,194 families residing in the city. The racial makeup of the city was 89.6% White, 4.4% Native American, 0.8% Black, 0.7% Asian, 0.1% Pacific Islander, 1.4% from other races, and 2.9% from two or more races. Hispanic or Latino of any race were 5.2% of the population.

There were 43,945 households, of which 28.9% had children under the age of 18 living with them, 43.7% were married couples living together, 11.3% had a female householder with no husband present, 4.6% had a male householder with no wife present, and 40.4% were non-families. 32.6% of all households were made up of individuals, and 12% had someone living alone who was 65 years of age or older. The average household size was 2.29 and the average family size was 2.90.

In the city, the population was spread out, with 22.6% of residents under the age of 18; 9.8% between the ages of 18 and 24; 26.3% from 25 to 44; 26.3% from 45 to 64; and 15% who were 65 years of age or older. The median age in the city was 37.5 years. The gender makeup of the city was 48.3% male and 51.7% female.

Income
As of 2000 the median income for a household in the city was $35,147, and the median income for a family was $45,032. Males had a median income of $32,525 versus $21,824 for females. The per capita income for the city was $19,207. About 9.2% of families and 12.0% of the population were below the poverty line, including 16.5% of those under age 18 and 7.0% of those age 65 or over. 29.4% of the population had a bachelor's degree or higher.

Economy
Billings' location was essential to its economic success. Billings future as a major trade and distribution center was basically assured from its founding as a railroad hub due to its geographic location. As Billings quickly became the region's economic hub, it outgrew the other cities in the region. The Billings trade area serves over a half million people. A major trade and distribution center, the city is home to many regional headquarters and corporate headquarters. With Montana having no sales tax, Billings is a retail destination for much of Wyoming, North and South Dakota as well as much of Montana east of the Continental Divide. $1 out of every $7 spent on retail purchases in Montana is being spent in Billings. The percentage of wholesale business transactions done in Billings is even stronger: Billings accounts for more than a quarter of the wholesale business for the entire state (these figures do not include Billings portion of sales for Wyoming and the Dakotas). Billings is an energy center; Billings sits amidst the largest coal reserves in the United States as well as large oil and natural gas fields.

In 2009, Fortune Small Business magazine named Billings the best small city in which to start a business. Billings has a diverse economy including a large and rapidly growing medical corridor that includes inpatient and outpatient health care. Billings has a large service sector including retail, hospitality and entertainment. The metro area is also home to 3 oil refineries, a sugar beet refining plant, commercial and residential construction, building materials manufacturing and distribution, professional services, financial services, banking, trucking, higher education (4 campuses, 19 others have a physical presence/classes), auto parts wholesaling and repair services, passenger and cargo air, cattle, media, printing, wheat and barley farming, milk processing, heavy equipment sales and service, business services, consumer services, food distribution, agricultural chemical manufacturing and distribution, energy exploration and production, surface and underground mining, metal fabrication, and many others providing a diverse and robust economy.

Corporate headquarters include Stillwater Mining Company, Kampgrounds of America, First Interstate Bank, and others.

The  is held every year here.

Arts and culture

Museums
 Yellowstone Art Museum
 The Moss Mansion Historic House Museum
 Western Heritage Center

Historic Areas
Billings Depot
 Downtown Historic District
 Boothill Cemetery
 Black Otter Trail
 Yellowstone Kelly's Grave

Zoos
 ZooMontana

Venues

MetraPark
MetraPark hosts a wide variety of events. The facilities in this venue include:
 MetraPark Arena, currently called "First Interstate Arena at MetraPark" due to sponsorship: Originally called the METRA, for "Montana Entertainment Trade and Recreation Arena", this 12,000-seat multi-purpose building was completed in 1975. Today, it is still owned by the City of Billings and Yellowstone County. It is the largest indoor venue in Montana and is used for concerts, rodeos, ice shows, motor sports events, and more. On June 20, 2010, the building was heavily damaged by the Father's Day Tornado. According to Metra officials, "the tornado also lifted most of the roof off the arena and collapsed walls." This required extensive repair work and parts of the building were redesigned to improve energy efficiency, parking lot access, acoustics and seating and add restrooms and concession areas. On April 10, 2011, the building reopened with an Elton John concert.
 In September 2022, Billings attorney, Gene Jarussi, filed a lawsuit against MetraPark and the Yellowstone County Commissioners (who own the premises) in which he claimed that public meeting law requirements were violated in the process of searching for a private company to manage MetraPark. Jarussi claimed in the original complaint that two of the three commissioners engaged in unauthorized communication with one of the bidders, Oak View Group (OVG), and generally did not allow for adequate public involvement in decision making. Yellowstone County decided to cancel the Request for Proposals (RFP) in light of the lawsuit, but Jarussi persisted with his allegations.
 The Grandstand: a canopied outdoor venue that seats 6,500 for horse racing, rodeos, and other events including outdoor concerts, demolished in 2020.  
 The Expo Center: a  multi-purpose arena.
 The Montana Pavilion: a  multi-purpose arena.

Alberta Bair Theater

The Alberta Bair Theater is a 1,400-seat performing arts venue noted for its 20-ton capacity hydraulic lift that raises and lowers the stage apron. Opened in 1931 and originally called the Fox Theater, it was renamed in 1987 in honor of Alberta Bair and her substantial donations that helped fund the building's renovation. Her father, Charles M. Bair, homesteaded the land the theater now occupies and she was born in a nearby house that still stands today.

Shrine Auditorium
Built in 1950, the Shrine Auditorium is a smaller, cost-effective venue that hosts national shows. It seats 2,340 for concerts and offers 550 off-street parking spots.

Dehler Park
Dehler Park is the new multi-use stadium that replaced Cobb Field and Athletic Park swimming pool in the summer of 2008. Cobb Field was a baseball stadium that was the home of the Billings Mustangs, the Pioneer League Rookie Affiliate of the Cincinnati Reds, from 1948 through 2007. Cobb Field was named after Bob Cobb, who was responsible for bringing professional baseball with the Mustangs to Billings. Cobb Field also hosted home games for local American Legion baseball teams. In 2006, Billings voters approved $12 million to be spent on constructing a new multi-use sports facility. Cobb Field was demolished in 2007 and construction of Dehler Park began at the end of the 2007 baseball season. The park debuted on June 29, 2008, when the Billings Scarlets faced the Bozeman Bucks in American Legion regular-season play. The new Dehler Park has a capacity of 3,500 to over 6,000.

Wendy's Field
Wendy's Field at Daylis Stadium is a local stadium used for high school games. It is next to Billings Senior High.

Centennial Ice Arena
Centennial Ice Arena is home to the Billings Amateur Hockey League, Figure Skating Clubs and Adult Hockey.

Babcock Theater

The Babcock Theater is a 750-seat performing arts theater in Billings, Montana. It was built in 1907 and at the time was considered the largest theater between Minneapolis and Seattle. Today, after extensive renovations, it hosts a variety of national acts.

Alterowitz Arena MSU-Billings
This 4,000-seat venue primarily hosts Yellowjacket sports, local events and some national touring events. This facility has gyms and racket ball courts as well as an Olympic-size pool with bleachers for aquatic events.

Fortin Center
Fortin Center is a 3,000-seat arena on the campus of Rocky Mountain College it is primarily used for the Rocky Mountain sports events.

Arts
 Alberta Bair Theater
 Art House Cinema and Pub
 Babcock Theatre
 Backyard Theatre
 Billings Public Library
 Billings Studio Theater
 Billings Symphony Orchestra
 Billings Youth Orchestra
 NOVA: Performing Arts Center
 Sacrifice Cliff Theatre CO. 
 Yellowstone Art Museum
 Yellowstone Chamber Players
 Yellowstone County Museum
 Yellowstone Repertory Theatre
 Western Heritage Center

Events
 Gay Pride Weekend (some years) (2022)
 MontanaFair (August) at the MetraPark fairgrounds
 Billings Artwalk: First Friday of every other month at downtown businesses.

Breweries
With eight microbreweries in the metropolitan area, Billings has more breweries than any community in Montana. The downtown breweries are, Yellowstone Valley Brewing Co., Thirsty Street Tap Room, Angry Hank's Tap Room, Carters Brewery, and Überbrew. Another nearby brewery, Red Lodge Ales Brewing Co., is in Red Lodge. Downtown Billings also has a distillery that makes a variety of handcrafted spirits. Trailhead Spirits is in the former train depot complex. Canyon Creek Brewery opened at the end of 2013 on Billings' west end. Another offering, the Last Chance Pub, opened downtown in 2016.

Sports
 Billings Mustangs, an independent Pioneer League baseball team that was formerly (up through 2020) affiliated with the Cincinnati Reds
 Billings Outlaws, a CIF indoor football team that played at First Interstate Arena.
 The NILE (Northern International Livestock Exposition) Rodeo at MetraPark Arena
 Great American Championship Motorcycle Hill Climb – billed as "The Oldest, Richest and Biggest Motorcycle Hill Climb in the United States"

Parks and recreation
Lake Elmo State Park
Skypoint
The Rims (also known as "The Rimrocks"), a set of rock and boulder formations that parallel Hwy MT-3 / East Airport Road which includes the following parks/trails
Yellowstone Kelly Interpretive Site

Government

Billings is the county seat of Yellowstone County, the most populous county in Montana. It is also the location of the James F. Battin Federal Courthouse, one of five federal courthouses for the District of Montana.

Billings is governed via the mayor council system. There are ten members of the city council who are elected from one of five wards with each ward electing two members. The mayor is elected in a citywide vote. Both the mayor and council members are officially nonpartisan. The city charter, also called the Billings, Montana City Code (BMCC) was established 1977.

Unlike some other cities in Montana, Billings' city ordinances do not contain provisions that forbid discrimination on the basis of sexual orientation or gender identity. An effort to pass a non-discrimination ordinance in Billings failed in 2014, after then-mayor Tom Hanel cast a tie-breaking vote against it at the conclusion of a meeting that lasted 8.5 hours. An effort to introduce an NDO measure to the City Council was briefly floated in September 2019 by a city council member, but was abandoned approximately a month later.

Education

Primary and secondary

Public
Billings has five school districts: Billings Public Schools, District 3, Elder Grove School District, Independent School District, and Canyon Creek School District. Billings Public Schools consists of 22 elementary schools, six middle schools, and three high schools (Senior High, Skyview High, and West High) that have approximately 15,715 students and 1,850 full-time employees. District 3, Independent, and Elder Grove School Districts each have one elementary school, those being Blue Creek Elementary, Elder Grove Elementary, and Independent Elementary, respectively. Canyon Creek School District operates Canyon Creek School, which serves grades K-8.

Private
 The Billings Catholic Schools operates Billings Central Catholic High School (grades 9–12), St. Francis Catholic School (grades K-8) and St Francis Daycare
 Trinity Lutheran Church operates Trinity Lutheran School, serving grades K-8
 Billings Christian Schools serves grades Pre-12
 Adelphi Christian Academy served grades K-12 (Closed at the end of the 2009 School Year)
 Billings Educational Academy serves grades K-12
 Grace Montessori Academy serves Pre-8
Sunrise Montessori serves 3 years to 5th grade

Colleges and universities

Billings has three institutions of higher learning. Montana State University Billings (MSU Billings) is part of the state university system, while Rocky Mountain College and Yellowstone Baptist College are private.

Montana State University Billings was founded in 1927 as Eastern Montana Normal College to train teachers. The name was shortened to Eastern Montana College in 1949, and it was given its present name when the Montana State University System reorganized in 1994. The university offers associate/bachelor's/master's degrees and certificates in fields such as business, education, and medicine. Around 5,000 students attend MSU Billings.

City College at MSU Billings was established in 1969 as the Billings Vocational-Technical Education Center. Its governance was passed to the Montana University System Board of Regents in 1987, when it became known as the College of Technology. It was officially merged with MSU Billings (then known as Eastern Montana College) in 1994. The name was changed to the present name in 2012. Known as the "comprehensive two-year college arm" of MSU Billings, the college offers degrees and programs in a variety of fields, including automotive, business, computer technology, and nursing.

Through the marriage of three institutions of higher learning Rocky Mountain College is Montana's oldest college. Rocky Mountain College (or RMC) was founded in 1878. The campus that became RMC was known as the Billings Polytechnic Institute until 1947, when it joined the Montana Collegiate Institute in Deer Lodge (Montana's first institution of higher learning) and Intermountain Union College in Helena to form to Rocky Mountain College. During the 2013 fall semester, there were 1,068 students attending Rocky Mountain College. The college offers 50 majors offered in 24 different fields including art, education, music, psychology, and theater. RMC is affiliated with the United Church of Christ, the United Methodist Church, and the Presbyterian Church (U.S.A.).

Yellowstone Baptist College is a small private Christian college in western Billings. It offers one degree: Bachelor of Arts in Christian Studies/Leadership. The YBC is affiliated with the Southern Baptist Convention and has close ties with Oklahoma Baptist University in Shawnee, Oklahoma. The YBC also plans to open a nondenominational branch called the Yellowstone Bible Institute in early 2013.

Media

The largest media market in Montana and Wyoming, Billings is serviced by a variety of print media. Newspaper service includes the Billings Gazette, a daily morning broadsheet newspaper printed in Billings, Montana, and owned by Lee Enterprises. It is the largest daily newspaper in Montana, with a Sunday circulation of 52,000 and a weekday circulation of 47,000. It publishes three editions: the state edition, which circulates in most of Eastern Montana and all of South Central Montana; the Wyoming edition, which circulates in Northern Wyoming; and the city edition, which circulates in Yellowstone County. Yellowstone County News is the next leading print newspaper, owned by Jonathan & Tana McNiven. It is published on a weekly basis and provides news and columns for "Yellowstone County and the communities of Lockwood, Shepherd, Huntley, Worden, Ballanatine, Pompey's Pillar, Custer and Billings." It is also recognized as the Publication of Record for both the City of Billings and Yellowstone County.  Other publications include other more specialized weekly and monthly publications. Billings also has several community magazines including Magic City Magazine and Yellowstone Valley Woman.
The Billings Beet also provides the region with satirical news. The Billings area has four major non-news television stations, two major news television stations, one community television station, four PBS channels and several Low-Power Television (LPTV) channels. It is also served by twenty-two commercial radio stations and Yellowstone Public Radio (NPR).

Infrastructure
The Billings Canal (aka, The Big Ditch), used for irrigation, runs through Billings.

Transportation

Airports
Billings Logan International Airport is close to downtown; it sits on top of the Rims, a  cliff that overlooks the downtown core. Scheduled passenger service and air cargo flights operate from this airfield.

It has three runways exclusively serving privately operated general aviation aircraft and helicopters.

Public transportation

The Billings METropolitan Transit is Billings' public transit system. MET Transit provides fixed-route and paratransit bus service to the City of Billings. All MET buses are accessible by citizens who use wheelchairs and other mobility devices. They are wheelchair lift-equipped and accessible to all citizens who are unable to use the stairs. MET buses are equipped with bike racks for their bike-riding passengers. There are Westend and Downtown transit centers allowing passengers to connect with all routes. The Billings Bus Terminal is served by Express Arrow, Greyhound and Jefferson Lines which also provide regional and interstate bus service.

Trail system

Billings has an extensive trail system running throughout the metro area. The rapidly expanding trail system, known as the Heritage trail system, has a large variety of well-maintained trails and pathways.

Bicycling magazine ranked Billings among the nation's 50 most bike-friendly communities. In 2012, the Swords Park Trail was named the Montana State Trail of the Year and received an Environmental and Wildlife Compatibility award from the Coalition for Recreational Parks.

Highways

Interstate 90 runs east–west through the southern portion of Billings, serving as a corridor between Billings Heights, Lockwood, Downtown, South Hills, Westend, Shiloh, and Laurel. East of Downtown, between Billings Heights and Lockwood, Interstate 90 connects with Interstate 94, which serves as an east–west corridor between Shepherd, Huntley, Lockwood, Downtown, South Hills, Westend, Shiloh, and Laurel via its connection with I-90.

The 2012 Billings area I-90 corridor planning study recommends many improvements to the corridor from Laurel through Lockwood. Among the improvements recommended are construction of new east and west bound bridges over the Yellowstone River, each bridge having three to four traffic lanes. Also recommended are construction of additional east and west bound traffic lanes from Shiloh to Johnson Lane and reconstruction of many of the bridges, interchanges and on-off ramps along the corridor at a cost of $114 million.

The Billings Bypass is a project designed to offer an alternative route into Billings Heights, to create a new and more direct connection between Billings and Lockwood and to connect I-90 with Montana Highway 87 and Old Highway 312. The study portion of the project is nearing its completion. Right of way acquisition should begin in 2013 along with final design followed by construction.

Montana Highway 3 is a north–south highway that runs along the edge of the North Rims connecting Downtown and the Westend with the Rehberg Ranch, Indian Cliffs and Billings Heights. U.S. Highway 87 runs through the center of Billings Heights and is known as Main Street within the city limits. This is the busiest section of roadway in the state of Montana. It connects to U.S. Highway 87 East, which runs through Lockwood as Old Hardin Road.

Rail
There is currently no service, though until 1979 Amtrak's North Coast Hiawatha stopped at the Billings Depot, serving a Chicago to Seattle route. Before Amtrak, Billings was well-served by Northern Pacific, Great Northern, and Chicago, Burlington, and Quincy railroads with direct routes to Kansas City, Denver, Chicago, Great Falls, and the West Coast. (Billings was the northern and western terminus for the Chicago, Burlington and Quincy Railroad).

Healthcare
The city's rapidly growing health care sector employed nearly 13,000 people in 2012; they earned $641 million in wages, or about 20 percent of all wages in the city. Employment doubled in 25 years and wage rates in constant dollars grew by 162 percent.

The city has two Level II trauma hospitals, St. Vincent Healthcare and Billings Clinic.

St. Vincent Healthcare was founded in 1898 by the Sisters of Charity of Leavenworth as St. Vincent Hospital. The name was changed to the present name in 2000. The hospital and its 30 clinics employ approximately 2,100 people and receive more than 400,000 patient visits each year. St. Vincent Healthcare is run by the Sisters of Charity of Leavenworth Health System, which operates health care facilities in Colorado, Kansas, and Montana.

Billings Clinic started in 1911 as the general practice of Dr. Arthur J. Movius. By 1939, three new general practitioners had joined Dr. Movius's practice and the name was changed to The Billings Clinic. Billings Deaconess Hospital (founded in 1907) merged with Billings Clinic in 1990 to form the current hospital. Billings Clinic now employs around 3,400 people and is one of the largest employers in Montana. In July 2012, Billings Clinic received a score of 72/100 for patient safety from Consumer Reports, making it the safest hospital of the 1,159 hospitals rated. Additionally, in January 2013, Billings Clinic was added to the Mayo Clinic Care Network, only the 12th hospital nationally to be added to the network and the only such health system in Montana.

Other medical facilities include the Northern Rockies Radiation Oncology Center, Rimrock Foundation (addiction treatment both inpatient and outpatient), Advanced Care Hospital of Montana (a 40-bed long-term acute-care hospital), South Central Montana Mental Health Center, Billings VA Community-Based Outpatient Clinic, Billings Clinic Research Center (pharmaceutical field trials, osteoporosis are two long-time focuses), Billings MRI, City/County Public Health's Riverstone Health, HealthSouth Surgery Center and Physical Therapy offices, Baxter/Travenol BioLife plasma collection center, and many independent practices.

Public safety
The Billings Police Department is the main law enforcement agency in Billings. It is the largest city police force in Montana, with about 136 sworn officers and 80 civilian employees. There are nine police beats.

The Billings Fire Department was founded in 1883 as a volunteer fire company named the Billings Fire Brigade. The Yellowstone Hook and Ladder Company was founded in 1886; that company was disbanded in 1888 after the mayor criticized the group for how that handled a fire, leaving the town without a fire department for almost six months. The last volunteer fire company, Maverick Hose Company, served as the city's fire department until 1918. The modern fire department has seven stations, employs 114 people, and received a class three rating by ISO.

Notable people
More widely famous people who have lived in Billings include:

Historical
 Frank Borman, astronaut
 Albert D. Cooley, aviator and Lieutenant general, USMC; Navy Cross
 Will James, artist and author
 Calamity Jane, frontierswoman
 Terry C. Johnston, western novelist
 Charles Lindbergh, aviator

Sports
 Gary Albright, wrestler
 Carolin Babcock, tennis player
 Jeff Ballard, Major League Baseball pitcher
 Ed Breding, former NFL player
 Julie Brown, distance runner
 Kurt Burris, former NFL player
 Mike Burton, Olympic gold medalist in swimming
 Ruben Castillo, boxer
 Jim Creighton, former NBA player
 Mitch Donahue, former NFL player
 Dwan Edwards, NFL player
 Brad Holland, former NBA player
 Chris Horn, former AFL and NFL player
 Dave McNally, Major League Baseball pitcher
 Roy McPipe, former ABA player
 Andy Moog, former NHL player
 Brent Musburger, sportscaster
 Nich Pertuit, football player
 Kirk Scrafford, former NFL player
 Greg Smith, former NHL player
 Leslie Spalding, LPGA golfer
 Keith Wortman, former NFL player

Arts and entertainment
 Carson Allen, singer and musician
 Phil Amato, television host
 Stanley Anderson, actor
 Katie Blair, Miss Montana Teen USA 2006, Miss Teen USA 2006
 John Dahl, movie director
 Annie Duke, professional poker player and author
 Bob Enevoldsen, jazz multi-instrumentalist
 Andrea Fraser, artist
 Arlo Guthrie, folk singer
 Ethel Hays, cartoonist and illustrator
 Will James, western artist
 Brandon Jovanovich, opera singer
 Wesley Kimler, artist
 Jeff Kober, actor
 Leo Kottke, musician
 Wally Kurth, actor
 Joyce La Mers, author of light poetry
 Bud Luckey, Academy Award Nominee, famed Pixar animator for Toy Story 1–3
 Helen Lynch, actress
 T. J. Lynch, screenwriter
 Stan Lynde, creator of the comic strip Rick O'Shay, painter, and novelist
 Chase McBride, singer, musician, and visual artist
 Ralph McQuarrie, Academy Award-winning designer for Cocoon, the original Star Wars trilogy, the original Battlestar Galactica, and E.T.: The Extra-Terrestrial
 Marlene Morrow, former Playboy Playmate of the Month
 J. K. Ralston, Western painter
 Chan Romero, pioneer of rock and roll was born in Billings
 Rick Rydell, talk radio host
 Pete Simpson, musician and television performer in the 1950s in Billings; later member of the Wyoming House of Representatives; Republican nominee for governor of Wyoming in 1986.
 Auggie Smith, comedian
 Carol Thurston, actress
 Chuck Tingle, two-time Hugo Award nominee
 David Yost, actor and producer, most notably the Blue Power Ranger on the Mighty Morphin Power Rangers
 Timothy DeLaGhetto, internet and television personality

Political
 James F. Battin, former Congressman from Montana
 Jim Battin, California State Senator
 Shane Bemis, Mayor of Gresham, Oregon
 John Bohlinger, former Lieutenant Governor of Montana
 Roy Brown, former Montana State Senator for District 25 and former gubernatorial candidate
 Conrad Burns, served in the U.S. Senate from 1988 to 2007
 Amanda Curtis, Montana State Representative for District 76 and U.S. Senate Democratic Candidate
 Mike Mansfield, U.S. Representative and U.S. Senator for Montana, longest-serving Senate majority leader for Democratic Party, and U.S. Ambassador to Japan
 Jonathan McNiven, former Montana State Representative 
 Ray Metcalfe, member of the Alaska House of Representatives
 Henry L. Myers, U.S. Senator and justice of the Supreme Court of Montana
 Denny Rehberg, former Congressman from Montana and former Lieutenant Governor of Montana
 Tom Stout, former Congressman from Montana and editorial writer for the Billings Gazette
 Burt L. Talcott, former Congressman from California

Tallest buildings

Billings is also home to the world's tallest load-bearing brick building, the DoubleTree Tower, which stands . With a floor count of 22 floors above ground level, the Crowne Plaza is the tallest hotel in the city and state. It was the tallest from 1980 to 1985. The Wells Fargo Building, formerly the Norwest Bank Building, was the tallest building in Montana from 1977 until 1980.

Sister cities
  Billings, Hessen, Germany
  Kumamoto, Kumamoto Japan

See also

 The USS Billings (LCS-15), a  littoral combat ship of the United States Navy, is named after the city of Billings.

References

Further reading

 Hardt, Mark D. "The Emergence of a Competitive Core: Bifurcation Dynamics in Billings, Montana." in Downtowns: Revitalizing the Centers of Small Urban Communities (2013).
 Mandler, Lou. "Billings and Beyond." Montana; The Magazine of Western History 68.4 (2018): 53-96, focus on  the progressive vision of mayor Willard Fraser, elected mayor of Billings four times between 1963 and 1971.

 Kliewer, Waldo O. "The Foundations of Billings, Montana." Pacific Northwest Quarterly 31.3 (1940): 255-283. online

 Van West, Carroll. Capitalism on the frontier: Billings and the Yellowstone Valley in the nineteenth century (U of Nebraska Press, 1993) online.

 Van West, Carroll. Images of Billings: A Photographic History (Billings: Western Heritage Press, 1990)
 Wright, Kathryn. Billings: The Magic City and How It Grew (Billings: K. H. Wright, 1978)
 An Illustrated History of the Yellowstone Valley, State of Montana (Spokane, Wash.: Western Historical Publishing Company, 1907)

External links

 City of Billings
 Billings Chamber of Commerce
 Billings Public Schools
 Billings Statistics
 Montana Convention and Visitors Bureau (Billings)

 
Cities in Montana
Cities in Yellowstone County, Montana
Billings metropolitan area
County seats in Montana
Populated places established in 1877
1877 establishments in Montana Territory
Railway towns in Montana